{{Infobox company
| name = Peraton Labs
| logo = Peraton Labs logo.png
| type = Subsidiary
| foundation = January 12, 2012
| location = 
| key_people = Petros Mouchtaris, PresidentTony Bogovic, VP, Corporate Development| parent = Peraton (May 2021 – current)
Perspecta Inc. (2018 – May 2021)Vencore, Inc. (2013–2018)Telcordia Technologies/Ericsson (2004–2013)SAIC (1997–2004) Baby Bells (1984–1997)
| homepage =  www.peratonlabs.com
}}Peraton Labs, previously branded as "Applied Communication Sciences,"
is a communications and information research and engineering company based in the United States.  Previously the R&D arm of Telcordia Technologies, the company became a business of Vencore, Inc in 2013.  It was then known as Vencore Labs''' until 2018 when its parent company merged to form Perspecta Inc. Perspecta merged with Peraton and is now Peraton Labs, which is headquartered in Basking Ridge, New Jersey, with laboratory facilities in Basking Ridge, Red Bank, NJ, and Silver Spring, MD.

History
Applied Communication Sciences' origins are in Bell Labs and the 1984 divestiture of AT&T. Subsequently, it operated primarily as the Applied Research group within Bellcore and Telcordia.

Business focus
Peraton Labs (formerly Applied Communication Sciences) addresses large-scale information and communications problems requiring deep knowledge of technology and operations. Particular areas of focus include cyber security, data analytics, wireless and mobility applications, advanced software methodologies, network and operations, information assurance, optical networking, application engineering and integration, and smart grid.

Including work as part of Telcordia, Peraton Labs (ACS) researchers have produced more than 2,000 patents across ADSL, ATM/SONET, Advanced Intelligent Network (AIN), optical networking / Wavelength-division multiplexing (WDM), wireless (3G/4G, cellular, mobility), security and other areas of communications and information.

Peraton Labs (ACS) is active in the development of a wide range of industry standards, with standards-bodies memberships including IEEE, ATIS, TIA, 3GPP, ETSI, OIF, Open Mobile Alliance, Open Geospatial Consortium, Small Cells Forum, ZigBee Alliance and related industry organizations.

Corporate ownership and structure

Peraton Labs (formerly Applied Communication Sciences) is a wholly owned subsidiary of Peraton, a systems engineering and integration company headquartered in Chantilly, Virginia (US).

References

External links
 

Research organizations in the United States
Companies based in Somerset County, New Jersey
American companies established in 2012
2012 establishments in New Jersey
Bernards Township, New Jersey